The Blackwood Miners Welfare Institute is a Grade II* listed building located at the north end of Blackwood High Street in Blackwood, Caerphilly, Wales and run by Caerphilly County Borough Council. Built and opened in 1925, it was originally used as a single floor snooker hall but was expanded eleven years later. It was sold to Islwyn Borough Council in 1989 after falling into disrepair and was reopened as an entertainment venue in February 1992.

It is a receiving venue for comedy, theatre and music and a producer in its own right. Its co-productions with Black Rat Theatre Company tour across Wales.

History
Blackwood Miners Welfare Institute was opened after the final stones of the building were laid on 4 December 1925 and was used as a single floor snooker hall owned by the Coal Industry and the Social Welfare Organisation. The local Miners Welfare Fund provided a £7,000 grant whilst miners raised £850 from their wages. Eleven years later two more floors were built which included a stage, auditorium, dance floor, reading room, library, ladies room and rehearsal rooms for local societies. Blackwood Miners Welfare Institute fell into disrepair during the 1970s and 1980s due to pit closures, and the miners' weekly contributions failed to retain the operations of the building. Its trustees sold it to Islwyn Borough Council in 1989 who pledged to refurbish the building for local community use. 

The building reopened on 17 February 1992 and it became an arts and entertainment venue with funding from Islwyn Borough Council and the Welsh Office. Blackwood Miners Welfare Institute is run by Caerphilly County Borough Council. Blackwood Miners Welfare Institute is today protected as a Grade II* listed building; this status was conferred onto the building on 31 May 2002 "as an especially well-preserved workmen's institute, a building type characteristic of industrial South Wales, specially important for its social-historical interest in addition to retaining strong internal and external architectural character". Caerphilly County Borough Council approved of refurbishing and restoration work to the interior and exterior of the building in June 2011 and it continued into 2012. The building was closed on 17 March 2020 as a consequence of the COVID-19 pandemic in Wales and re-opened on 17 September 2021. Swansea University holds a collection of papers relating to the operation of the building in its archives. They include two boxes containing minutes of its committee from 1927 to 1945 and monthly accounts from between 1937 and 1945.

Profile 
Blackwood Miners Welfare Institute is a free standing building. It has a stone facade with a symatterial front containing three bays as well as three stories with the two outer ones featuring stepped parapets. The ground floor has rusticated ashlar piers with free plain ashlar above it and not any classical ornament to pilasters and windows. It has the Memorial Theatre inside which has a grid and orchestra pit which can accommodate up to 30 musicians. It is flat-floored with an raked rear within the double-height auditorium that features little decoration and a curved barrel that is divided up into a series of arches that are decorated. The building does not have a balcony.

References

External links 
 

Grade II* listed buildings in Caerphilly County Borough